The 1934 Ohio Northern Polar Bears football team was an American football team that represented Ohio Northern University in the Ohio Athletic Conference during the 1934 college football season. In their fourth year under head coach Harris Lamb, the Polar Bears compiled a 6–0–1 record, did not allow opponents to score a point, and outscored opponents by a total of 104 to 0.

Schedule

References

Ohio Northern
Ohio Northern Polar Bears football seasons
College football undefeated seasons
Ohio Northern football